Hans Tobias Forsberg (born April 5, 1988) is a Swedish former professional ice hockey player. He played in the Swedish Hockey League (SHL) with Modo Hockey and Leksands IF.

Playing career 
Forsberg is the brother of Johan Forsberg. Forsberg joined IF Björklöven on January 30, 2009, from Modo Hockey of the Elitserien and left the team after only four months to sign with VIK Västerås HK on 11 May 2009. Prior to the 2011–12 season he signed with Leksands IF.

In the 2018–19 season, while playing with Leksands in the Allsvenskan, Forsberg suffered a career-ending injury in a game against Almtuna IS on December 26, 2018. Crashing into the boards head first, he fractured his neck in multiple places, suffering an injury to his spinal cord. As a result he was paralysed below the chest and has limited function of his arms. With Leksands later regaining promotion to the SHL, the club set up a fund to support Forsberg in his ongoing rehabilitation.

References

External links

1988 births
IF Björklöven players
Leksands IF players
Living people
Modo Hockey players
People from Piteå
Swedish ice hockey right wingers
VIK Västerås HK players
Sportspeople from Norrbotten County